Edem may refer to:

 Edem, an ancient kingdom in Nigeria
 Edem (name)
 EDEM, the Greek Women's Engineering Association